Events from the year 1599 in art.

Events
July 23 - Caravaggio receives his first public commission for paintings.

Works

Paul Bril – Mountain Scene (miniature)
Caravaggio
Basket of Fruit
Judith Beheading Holofernes
David and Goliath
Narcissus
Pieter Pietersz the Elder – Poor Parents, Rich Children
Hendrick van Balen the Elder – The Judgement of Paris

Births
February 15 - Pope Alexander II, Papal patron of the arts commissioned architectural and sculptural works by Gianlorenzo Bernini (died 1667)
March 22 – Anthony van Dyck, Flemish Baroque artist who became England's leading court painter (died 1641)
 June – Diego Velázquez, Spanish painter (died 1660)
September 25 – Francesco Borromini (Francesco Castelli), prominent and influential Baroque architect in Rome (died 1667)
November 30 – Andrea Sacchi, Italian painter of High Baroque Classicism (died 1661)
December – Pieter van Laer, Dutch painter of genre scenes (died 1642)
December 11 – Pieter Codde, Dutch painter of genre works (died 1678)
date unknown
Francisco Collantes, Spanish Baroque era painter (died 1656)
Willem Cornelisz Duyster, Dutch painter from Amsterdam (died 1635)
Jan Miel, Flemish painter (died 1663)
Gerrit Reynst, Dutch merchant and art collector (died 1658)
Giovanni Battista Vanni, Italian painter of frescoes and engraver (died 1660)
Robert Walker – English portrait painter (died 1658)
probable
Bartolommeo Coriolano, Italian engraver (died 1676)
Antioine Le Nain, French painter of the Le Nain family of painters (died 1648)

Deaths
October 27 - Gillis Coignet, painter (born 1540)
date unknown
Alberto di Giovanni Alberti, Tuscan architect, wood carver and painter (born 1525)
Antoine Caron, French master glassmaker, illustrator, Mannerist painter and a master (teacher) at the School of Fontainebleau (born 1521)
Valerio Cioli, Italian sculptor (born 1529)
Gillis Coignet, Flemish painter (born 1542)
Wendel Dietterlin, German painter/architect, wrote treatise on the five orders entitled Architectura (1598) filled with Mannerist ornament (born 1550)
Giuseppe Meda, Italian painter, architect and hydraulics engineer (born c.1534)
Dominicus Lampsonius, Flemish poet and artist (born 1532)
Francesco Potenzano, Italian painter, poet, and promoter
Friedrich Sustris, Italian-born Dutch painter working in Bavaria (born c.1540)
Mayken Verhulst, Flemish miniaturist and watercolour painter (born 1518)
Pierre Woeiriot, French engraver, goldsmith, painter, sculptor and medallist (born 1532)

 
Years of the 16th century in art